John Christian Galliquio Castro (born 1 December 1979) is a retired Peruvian footballer. He was a centre-back. He was called to play for the Peru national football team for the Copa America 2007, where he played 4 games with a regular performance.

Galliquio has made 41 appearances for the Peru national football team scoring one goal.

Club career
Galliquio began his career as a youth player for local club Deportivo Radioloros in 1994. Then he would have spells playing for other Pisco-based clubs until arriving at Ica to play for Estudiantes de Medicina, where he played in the Copa Perú division. His performances in the Copa Perú convinced Universitario de Deportes to sign him and then loan him out to their farm team, América Cochahuayco. There he participated in the 1999 Segunda División Peruana season.

Galliquio returned to Universitario for 2000 season.
He made his league debut in the Descentralizado on 6 February 2000 under the manager Roberto Challe in a 0–0 draw against FBC Melgar for the Apertura.

Honours
América Cochahuayco
Segunda División Peruana: 1999
Universitario de Deportes
Peruvian Primera División : 2000, 2009, 2013
Sporting Cristal
Peruvian Primera División: 2005
FBC Melgar
Peruvian Primera División: 2015

International goals

References

External links
 
 
 

1979 births
Living people
People from Pisco, Peru
Peruvian footballers
Peru international footballers
Peruvian expatriate footballers
Estudiantes de Medicina footballers
Club Universitario de Deportes footballers
U América F.C. footballers
Cruz Azul footballers
Racing Club de Avellaneda footballers
Sporting Cristal footballers
Club Deportivo Universidad de San Martín de Porres players
FC Dinamo București players
León de Huánuco footballers
FBC Melgar footballers
Serrato Pacasmayo players
Copa Perú players
Peruvian Segunda División players
Peruvian Primera División players
Argentine Primera División players
Liga I players
Peruvian expatriate sportspeople in Mexico
Expatriate footballers in Mexico
Peruvian expatriate sportspeople in Argentina
Expatriate footballers in Argentina
Expatriate footballers in Romania
Peruvian expatriate sportspeople in Romania
Association football central defenders
2007 Copa América players